"One-Two-Five" is a song by 10cc released as a first single in 1980 from the album Look Hear?. It is a reference to disco's 125 beats per minute tempo.

Release and promotion
"One-Two-Five" was released as a first single outside America ahead of the album Look Hear?. The song was promoted by a music video directed by Russell Mulcahy based on the Eric Stewart's idea of 'disco-ectomy'.

The single failed to chart in the band's native UK, which was the first time since 1974's The Original Soundtrack that a lead single wouldn't become a hit. However, the song became a top 10 hit in Norway.

Personnel
Eric Stewart – vocals, electric guitar
Graham Gouldman – vocals, bass, electric guitar
Paul Burgess – drums, percussion
Rick Fenn – electric guitar
Stuart Tosh – vocals, percussion
Duncan Mackay – Yamaha CS-80 synthesizer

Chart performance

References

10cc songs
1980 songs
1980 singles
Songs written by Eric Stewart
Songs written by Graham Gouldman
Mercury Records singles